The scarce swift (Schoutedenapus myoptilus) is a species of swift in the family Apodidae.
It has a disjunct range of presence throughout the Afromontane : Cameroon line, Albertine Rift montane forests, Kenya, Tanzania, Malawi and Mozambique.

It is the only species in the genus Schoutedenapus. Schouteden's swift (Schoutedenapus schoutedeni) was previously considered a distinct species, but was found to be a darker juvenile or sub-adult scarce swift subspecies chapini.

References

External links
 Scarce swift - Species text in The Atlas of Southern African Birds.

scarce swift
Birds of the Gulf of Guinea
Birds of Central Africa
Birds of East Africa
scarce swift
scarce swift
Taxonomy articles created by Polbot